The 2012 Copa Sony Ericsson Colsanitas was a women's tennis tournament played on outdoor clay courts. It was the 15th edition of the Copa Sony Ericsson Colsanitas, and was on the International category of the 2012 WTA Tour. It took place at the Club Campestre El Rancho in Bogotá, Colombia, from February 13 through February 19, 2012. Lara Arruabarrena-Vecino won the singles title.

Singles main draw entrants

Seeds

1 Rankings as of February 6, 2012

Other entrants
The following players received wildcards into the main draw:
 Catalina Castaño
 Karen Castiblanco
 Yuliana Lizarazo

The following players received entry from the qualifying draw:
 Inés Ferrer Suárez
 Sesil Karatantcheva
 Paula Ormaechea
 Yaroslava Shvedova

Withdrawals
  Sara Errani (right knee injury)

Doubles main draw entrants

Seeds

1 Rankings are as of February 6, 2012

Other entrants
The following pairs received wildcards into the doubles main draw:
  Karen Castiblanco /  Paula Ormaechea
  Gisela Dulko /  Paola Suárez

Retirements
  Romina Oprandi (right knee injury)

Champions

Singles

 Lara Arruabarrena-Vecino def.  Alexandra Panova 6–2, 7–5
It was Arruabarrena-Vecino's first career title.

Doubles

 Eva Birnerová /  Alexandra Panova def.  Mandy Minella /  Stefanie Vögele, 6–2, 6–2

External links
Official website

Copa Sony Ericsson Colsanitas
Copa Colsanitas
2012 in Colombian tennis